Zsolt Bognár (born 28 March 1979 in Csorna) is a Hungarian football player, he currently plays for Gyirmót SE.

Club career
Zsolt Bognár started his football career with minor Hungarian teams, including Szombathelyi Haladás and Győri ETO. Zsolt was soon noticed by Ferencváros, the most renowned and successful team in Hungary.

In 2007, he transferred from Ferencváros to Italian Serie B club Frosinone, and made his debut in a 2–1 defeat to Lecce.

References

External links

Virtus Lanciano

1979 births
Living people
People from Csorna
Hungarian footballers
Association football defenders
Hungary under-21 international footballers
Szombathelyi Haladás footballers
Győri ETO FC players
Ferencvárosi TC footballers
Frosinone Calcio players
S.S. Virtus Lanciano 1924 players
Diósgyőri VTK players
Gyirmót FC Győr players
Soproni VSE players
Kisvárda FC players
Nemzeti Bajnokság I players
Serie B players
Hungarian expatriate footballers
Expatriate footballers in Italy
Hungarian expatriate sportspeople in Italy
Sportspeople from Győr-Moson-Sopron County